In mathematics, a direct limit is a way to construct a (typically large) object from many (typically smaller) objects that are put together in a specific way. These objects may be groups, rings, vector spaces or in general objects from any category. The way they are put together is specified by a system of homomorphisms (group homomorphism, ring homomorphism, or in general morphisms in the category) between those smaller objects. (This is a slight abuse of notation as it suppresses the system of homomorphisms that is crucial for the structure of the limit.) 

Direct limits are a special case of the concept of colimit in category theory. Direct limits are dual to inverse limits, which are also a special case of limits in category theory.

Formal definition
We will first give the definition for algebraic structures like groups and modules, and then the general definition, which can be used in any category.

Direct limits of algebraic objects
In this section objects are understood to consist of underlying sets equipped with a given algebraic structure, such as groups, rings, modules (over a fixed ring), algebras (over a fixed field), etc. With this in mind, homomorphisms are understood in the corresponding setting (group homomorphisms, etc.).

Let  be a directed set.
  for all .

Its underlying set is the disjoint union of the 's modulo a certain :

Intuitively, two elements in the disjoint union are equivalent if and only if they "eventually become equal" in the direct system. An equivalent formulation that highlights the duality to the inverse limit is that an element is equivalent to all its images under the maps of the direct system, i.e.  whenever .

One obtains from this definition canonical functions  sending each element to its equivalence class. Formally, the direct limit of the direct system  consists of the object  together with the canonical homomorphisms .

Direct limits in an arbitrary category 
The direct limit can be defined in an arbitrary category  by means of a universal property. A direct limit of the direct system  is a universally repelling target  in the sense that  is a target and for each target , there is a unique morphism  such that  for each i. The following diagram

will then commute for all i, j. 

The direct limit is often denoted

with the direct system  and the canonical morphisms  being understood.

Unlike for algebraic objects, not every direct system in an arbitrary category has a direct limit. If it does, however, the direct limit is unique in a strong sense: given another direct limit X′ there exists a unique isomorphism X′ → X that commutes with the canonical morphisms.

Examples
A collection of subsets  of a set  can be partially ordered by inclusion. If the collection is directed, its direct limit is the union . The same is true for a directed collection of subgroups of a given group, or a directed collection of subrings of a given ring, etc.
The weak topology of a CW complex is defined as a direct limit.
Let  be any directed set with a greatest element .
Let K be a field. For a positive integer n, consider the general linear group GL(n;K) consisting of invertible n x n - matrices with entries from K. We have a group homomorphism GL(n;K) → GL(n+1;K) that enlarges matrices by putting a 1 in the lower right corner and zeros elsewhere in the last row and column. The direct limit of this system is the general linear group of K, written as GL(K). An element of GL(K) can be thought of as an infinite invertible matrix that differs from the infinite identity matrix in only finitely many entries. The group GL(K) is of vital importance in algebraic K-theory.
Let p be a prime number.
There is a (non-obvious) injective ring homomorphism from the ring of symmetric polynomials in  variables to the ring of symmetric polynomials in  variables. Forming the direct limit of this direct system yields the ring of symmetric functions.
Let F be a C-valued sheaf on a topological space X. Fix a point x in X. The open neighborhoods of x form a directed set ordered by inclusion (U ≤ V if and only if U contains V). The corresponding direct system is (F(U), rU,V) where r is the restriction map. The direct limit of this system is called the stalk of F at x, denoted Fx. For each neighborhood U of x, the canonical morphism F(U) → Fx associates to a section s of F over U an element sx of the stalk Fx called the germ of s at x.
Direct limits in the category of topological spaces are given by placing the final topology on the underlying set-theoretic direct limit.
An ind-scheme is an inductive limit of schemes.

Properties 
Direct limits are linked to inverse limits via

An important property is that taking direct limits in the category of modules is an exact functor. This means that if you start with a directed system of short exact sequences  and form direct limits, you obtain a short exact sequence .

Related constructions and generalizations 
We note that a direct system in a category  admits an alternative description in terms of functors. Any directed set  can be considered as a small category  whose objects are the elements  and there is a morphisms   if and only if . The colimit of this functor is the same as the direct limit of the original direct system.

A notion closely related to direct limits are the filtered colimits. Here we start with a covariant functor  from a filtered category  to some category  and form the colimit of this functor. One can show that a category has all directed limits if and only if it has all filtered colimits, and a functor defined on such a category commutes with all direct limits if and only if it commutes with all filtered colimits.

The categorical dual of the direct limit is called the inverse limit. As above, inverse limits can be viewed as limits of certain functors and are closely related to limits over cofiltered categories.

Terminology 
In the literature, one finds the terms "directed limit", "direct inductive limit", "directed colimit", "direct colimit" and "inductive limit" for the concept of direct limit defined above. The term "inductive limit" is ambiguous however, as some authors use it for the general concept of colimit.

See also 

 Direct limits of groups

Notes

References
 
 

Limits (category theory)
Abstract algebra